This is a list of notable painters from, or associated with, Spain.

A
Juan Martínez Abades
Juan de la Abadía
Maria de Abarca
Cristóbal de Acevedo
Manuel Acevedo
Ramón Acín
Joaquín Agrasot
Benito Manuel Agüero
José Aguiar
Tomas de Aguiar
Miguel del Aguila
Diego de Aguilar
Jorge Aguilar-Agon
Francisco de Aguirre
Lorenzo Aguirre
Manuel Aguirre y Monsalbe
Francisco Agullo
Francisco Agustín y Grande
Francisco Albert
Andres Alcantara
Arnau Alemany
Leonardo Alenza
Juan de Alfaro y Gámez
Juan Alfon
Germán Álvarez Algeciras
Luís Alimbrot
José Casado del Alisal
Fernando Yáñez de la Almedina
Ramon Martí Alsina
Andrés Amaya
Francisco de Amberes
Begoña Ameztoy
Mariano Andreu
Olga Andrino
Francisco Antolínez
José Antolínez
José Aparicio
José Jiménez Aranda
Antonio Sánchez Araujo
Alonso del Arco
Teodoro Ardemans
Juan de Arellano
Juan Ramírez de Arellano
Antonio de Arfian
Kiko Argüello
Antonio Fernández Arias
Eduardo Arranz-Bravo
Josep Arrau i Barba
Isidoro Arredondo
Eugenio de Arriba
Diego de Arroyo
Eduardo Arroyo
José Arrue
Ramiro Arrue
Jorge Artajo
Matias de Arteaga
Aurelio Arteta
Francisco de Artiga
Diego de Astor
Jerónima de la Asunción
Luis Eduardo Aute
Serafín Avendaño
Hernando de Ávila
José María Avrial
Bernabé de Ayala
Fernando Zóbel de Ayala y Montojo

B
Isabel Bacardit
Bernardo Ferrándiz Bádenes
José Antonio Sánchez Baíllo
Elena Bajo
Eduardo Balaca
José Balaca
Ricardo Balaca
Juan Navarro Baldeweg
Vicenç Badalona Ballestar
Antonia Bañuelos
Lluís Barba
Joaquín Bárbara y Balza
Mariano Barbasán
Salvador Sánchez Barbudo
Vicente Calderón de la Barca
Miquel Barceló
Miguel Arias Bardou
Sebastián Herrera Barnuevo
Josep Tapiró Baró
Francisco Barrera
Juan de Barroeta
Ricardo Baroja
Laureano Barrau
Rafael Romero Barros
Miguel Barroso
Arnau Bassa
Ferrer Bassa
Nestor Basterretxea
Gregorio Bausá
Josefa Bayeu
Ramón Bayeu
Francisco Bayeu y Subías
Juan Bautista Bayuco
Gaspar Becerra
Valeriano Bécquer
Antonio Cabral Bejarano
José Denis Belgrano
Eduardo Benito
José Benlliure y Gil
Magín Berenguer
Josep Berga i Boix
Bartolomé Bermejo
Martín Bernat
Alonso Berruguete
Pedro Berruguete
Aureliano de Beruete
Miquel Bestard
Gonzalo Bilbao
Antonio Bisquert
María Blanchard
Josefa Ruiz Blasco
Geronimo de Bobadilla
Pedro Atanasio Bocanegra
Camil Bofill
Laurent Le Bon
Joan Fuster Bonnin
Juan de Borgoña
Nicolás Borrás
Lluís Borrassà
Alfons Borrell i Palazón
Juan Rodríguez Botas
Ángel Botello
Juan Antonio García de Bouzas
Fernando Brambila
Julio Peris Brell
Narciso Méndez Bringa
Elena Brockmann
Joan Brotat
Ayne Bru
Mosen Vicente Bru
Roser Bru
Salvador Bru
Antonio Brugada
Joan Brull
Francisco Bustamante
Encarnación Bustillo Salomón
Ambrosio Martínez Bustos

C
Antoni Caba
Javier Cabada
Andrea López Caballero
José Caballero
Lita Cabellut
Juan Martín Cabezalero
Francisco Sans Cabot
Manuel Cabré
Margarita Cabrera
Andrés de la Calleja
Ricardo Arredondo Calmache
Hermenegildo Anglada Camarasa
Ignacio Pinazo Camarlench
José Camarón Bonanat
Orazio Cambiasi
Francisco Camilo
Pedro Campaña
Pedro de Campolargo
Pedro de Camprobín
Ricard Canals
Miguel Navarro Cañizares
Alonzo Cano
José María Cano
Antonio Guzmán Capel
Vicenç Caraltó
Juan de Valdés Carasquilla
Peris Carbonell
José Moreno Carbonero
Felipe Cardeña
Valentín Carderera
Bartolomeo Carducci
Vincenzo Carducci
Fernando Briones Carmona
Manuel Salvador Carmona
Antonio Carnicero
Francisco Caro
Maria Luisa Carranque y Bonavía
Ricardo Urgell Carreras
Luis de Carvajal
Carlos Casagemas
Lorenzo Casanova
Juan Francisco Casas
Ramon Casas
Pere Borrell del Caso
Abdón Castañeda
Yolanda Castaño
Joan Castejón
Vicente Castell
Manuel Castellano
Fabrizio Castello
Félix Castello
Federico Castellón
Claudio Castelucho
Agustín del Castillo
Jorge Castillo
José del Castillo
Juan del Castillo
Antonio del Castillo y Saavedra
Antonio Castrejon
Pedro Sánchez de Castro
Luis Álvarez Catalá
Bartolomeo Cavarozzi
Eugenio Caxés
Mateo Cerezo
Pablo de Céspedes
Manuel Chabrera
Charris
Felipe Checa
Ulpiano Checa
José de Cieza
Miguel Jerónimo de Cieza
Romulo Cincinato
Isabel de Cisneros
Francisco Clapera
Aleix Clapés
Antoni Clavé
Pelegrí Clavé
Antonio Vela Cobo
Alonso Sánchez Coello
Claudio Coello
Pau Faner Coll
Francisco Collantes
Josep Collell
Jaime Colson
Francisco de Comontes
Andrés de la Concha
Félix de la Concha
Miguel Condé
Emília Coranty Llurià
José Villegas Cordero
Joaquín Lloréns Fernández de Cordoba
Gabriel de la Corte
Juan de la Corte
Ángel María Cortellini
Jerónimo Cosida
Juan Sánchez Cotán
Adelardo Covarsí
Giovanni Battista Crescenzi
Juan Pantoja de la Cruz
Manuel de la Cruz
Salvador Martínez Cubells
María Ángeles Fernández Cuesta
Pedro de las Cuevas
Modest Cuixart
Josep Cusachs

D
Pierre Daix
Salvador Dalí
Lluís Dalmau
Miguel Danus
María Dávila
Antonio Muñoz Degrain
Ramón Destorrents
Daniel Vázquez Díaz
Diego Valentín Díaz
Felipe Diricksen
Giovanni Do
Óscar Domínguez
Francesc d'A. Planas Doria
Françoise Duparc
Pedro Duque y Cornejo

E
Baltasar de Echave
Juan de Echevarría
Rogelio de Egusquiza
Feliu Elias
Ramon de Elorriaga
Ramon Enrich
Miriam Escofet
Joseba Eskubi
Joaquim Espalter
Argimiro España
Juan de Espinal
Benito Espinós
Jerónimo Jacinto de Espinosa
Jerónimo Rodríguez de Espinosa
Juan de Espinosa
Juan Bautista de Espinosa
Antonio María Esquivel
Agustín Esteve
Jose Etxenagusia
Gerónimo Antonio de Ezquerra

F
Antonio Fabrés
Nicolás Factor
Manuel Carnicer Fajó
Juan Conchillos Falco
Luis Ricardo Falero
Antonio Cortina Farinós
Fernando San Martín Félez
Alejo Fernández
Francisco Fernández
Luis Fernández
Virgilio Ruiz Fernández
Alejandro Ferrant y Fischermans
Isidoro Lázaro Ferré
Maties Palau Ferré
Pedro García Ferrer
Asunción Ferrer y Crespí
Augusto Ferrer-Dalmau
Dionisio Fierros
Domènec Fita i Molat
Juan de Flandes
Jordi Forniés
Marià Fortuny
Alfonso Fraile
Esteban Francés
Nicolás Francés
Plácido Francés y Pascual
Manuel Franquelo
Juan Antonio de Frías y Escalante
Jesus Fuertes
Felícia Fuster

G
Antonio Ortiz Gacto
Gervasio Gallardo
Blas Gallego
Fernando Gallego
Baldomer Galofre
José Galofré y Coma
Enric Galwey
Sofía Gandarias
Juan José Gárate
Antonio López García
Pedro Flores García
Manuel García y Rodríguez
Pablo Gargallo
José Garnelo
Elvira Gascón
Agustin Gasull
Josep Gausachs
Alejandrina Gessler y Lacroix
Baldomer Gili i Roig
José Manuel Broto Gimeno
Vicente Giner
Antonio Gisbert
Simó Gómez
Vicente Salvador Gómez
Manuel Gómez-Moreno González
Julio González (sculptor)
Teo González
Alejandro González Velázquez
Bartolomé González y Serrano
Luis Gordillo
Xavier Gosé
Francisco Goya
Félix Granda
Antonio Fillol Granell
Eugenio Granell
Niccolò Granello
Blasco de Grañén
Lluís Graner
Jorge Grau
Tomás Graves
El Greco
Juan Gris
Pierre Le Guennec
José Guerrero
Adolfo Guiard
Manuel Ussel de Guimbarda
Josep Guinovart
Vicente Guirri
Juan Simón Gutiérrez

H
Carlos de Haes
Juan van der Hamen
Eugenio Hermoso
José Hernández
Francisco Hernández Tomé
José Cruz Herrera
Francisco Herrera the Elder
Francisco Herrera the Younger
José García Hidalgo
Antonio L'Horfelin
Gaspar de la Huerta
Jaume Huguet

I
Concha Ibáñez
Agustín Ibarrola
Jorge Inglés
Joaquín Inza y Ainsa
Ignacio de Iriarte
Juan Ismael
Francisco Iturrino
Alicia Iturrioz

J
Jacomart
Juan de Jáuregui
Juan Galván Jiménez
Miguel Jaume y Bosch
Laurent Jiménez-Balaguer
Carmen Jiménez (1920–2016)
Matías Jimeno
Esprit Jouffret
Fernando Márquez Joya
Ana Juan
Juan Rodríguez Juárez
Asensio Julià

L
Juan Fernández el Labrador
Antón Lamazares
Francisco Lameyer
José Lamiel
Antonio de Lanchares
Víctor Patricio de Landaluze
Diego Lara
Jesús Mari Lazkano
Abigail Lazkoz
Juan de Valdés Leal
Simón de León Leal
Blas de Ledesma
Clara Ledesma
José de Ledesma
Pablo Legote
Cristóbal de León
Felipe de León
Jean Paul Leon
Juan Valdemira de León
Ignacio de León Salcedo
Agustín Leonardo
José Leonardo
Francisco Leonardoni
Andrés Leyto
Diego de Leyva
Felipe de Liaño
Juan de Licalde
Diego Vidal de Liendo
Isaac Lievendal
Buonaventura Ligli
Esteban Lisa
Francisco Llamas
Hernando de los Llanos
Sebastián de Llanos y Valdés
Cristóbal Lloréns
Bernardo Germán de Llórente
Otho Lloyd
Alejandro de Loarte
Juan de Loaysa y Giron
Baltasar Lobo
Cristóbal López (18th century)
Diego López
Francisco López
Jaime López
Josef López
Pedro López
Francisco López Caro
Francisco Lopez y Palomino
Roberto López Corrales
Claudi Lorenzale
Alejandro Lozano
Antonio Rodríguez Luna
José Luzán

M
Ricardo Macarrón
Pedro Machuca
Federico de Madrazo
Luis de Madrazo
Ricardo de Madrazo
José de Madrazo y Agudo
Raimundo de Madrazo y Garreta
Federico de Madrazo y Ochoa
Mariano Salvador Maella
Juan Bautista Maíno
Maruja Mallo
Roberto Mangú
César Manrique
Miguel Manrique
Francisco de Burgos Mantilla
Esteban March
Vicente March
Pedro de Villegas Marmolejo
Francisco Domingo Marqués
Luis Marsans
José Martí y Monsó
Raúl Martín
Asterio Mañanós Martínez
Antonio Alonso Martinez
Crisóstomo Martínez
Elías García Martínez
Jusepe Martínez
Juan Bautista Martínez del Mazo
María Teresa Martín-Vivaldi
Bernat Martorell
Andrés Marzo
Joan Mas
Arcadi Mas i Fondevila
Vicente Masip
Vicente Juan Masip
Francesc Masriera
Josep Masriera
Federico Beltrán Masses
Master of Arguis
Master of Castelsardo
Master of Pedret
Master of Riglos
Master of Taüll
Master of the Cypresses
Master of the Retablo of the Reyes Catolicos
Jaume Mateu
Fidel Roig Matons
Fabio McNamara
Nicolás Megía
Eliseu Meifrèn
Luis Egidio Meléndez
María Juana Hurtado de Mendoza
Francisca Efigenia Meléndez y Durazzo
Felipe Gil de Mena
Carmen Babiano Méndez-Núñez
Benet Mercadé
Saülo Mercader
Jesus de Miguel
Manolo Millares
Francesc Miralles i Galaup
Rosa Mirambell i Càceres
Juan Carreño de Miranda
Juan García de Miranda
Pedro Rodríguez de Miranda
Joan Miró
Gabriel Móger
Antonio Mohedano
Ángel Lizcano Monedero
Bartolomé Montalvo
Rafael Monleón
Luis de Morales
Matías Moreno
Jacint Morera
Jaume Morera i Galícia
Pedro de Moya
Evaristo Muñoz
Glòria Muñoz
Bartolomé Esteban Murillo
José Ramón Muro

N
Carlos Nadal
Eduardo Naranjo
Angelo Nardi
Juan Fernández Navarrete
Eva Navarro
Jorge Velasco Navarro
José Navarro
Miquel Navarro
Rafael Navarro
Jerónimo Navases
Antonio Juez Nieto
Romeo Niram
Isidre Nonell
Pilar Nouvilas i Garrigolas
Requena Nozal
Marina Núñez

O
Josefa de Óbidos
Pedro de Obregón
Jenaro de Urrutia Olaran
Agustín Olguera
Eugenio Oliva
Fausto Olivares
Ceferí Olivé
Fernande Olivier
Quintana Olleras
Ricard Opisso
Gaston Orellana
Angel Orensanz
José Sanfrancisco Orero
Pedro Orrente
Manuel Ortega
Francisco Pradilla Ortiz
Francisco de Osona
Rodrigo de Osona
Francisco Meneses Osorio

P
Francisco Pacheco
Francesco Pagano
Jordi Pagans i Monsalvatje
Francisco de Palacios
Pablo Palazuelo
Benjamín Palencia
Gaetano Palmaroli
Vicente Palmaroli
Antonio Palomino
Robert Pérez Palou
Juan de Pareja
Marcial Gómez Parejo
Luis Paret y Alcázar
Josep Pascó i Mensa
Francisco de Paula Van Halen
Joan Comas Pausas
Pedro Pedraja
Fernand Pelez
Josep Lluís Pellicer
Rafael de Penagos
Juan de Peñalosa
Jesús Peñarreal
Antonio de Pereda
Alonso Pérez
Andrés Pérez
Antonio Bisquert Pérez
Bartolomé Pérez
Gonzalo Pérez
María Luisa Pérez Herrero (1898–1934)
Sara Rojo Pérez
Lorenzo Pericás
Emilio Sánchez Perrier
Pablo Picasso
Ramon Pichot
Luis Menéndez Pidal
Joaquim Pijoan i Arbocer
Adrià Pina
Bernardo López Piquer
Luis López Piquer
Antoni Pitxot
Alberto Pla y Rubio
Cecilio Plá
Josefina Tanganelli Plana
Juan Batlle Planas
Angel Planells
Francisco del Plano
Casto Plasencia
Andrés López Polanco
Bernardo Polo
Diego Polo the Elder
Diego Polo the Younger
Roque Ponce
Pablo Pontons
Antonio Ponz
Jaime Mosen Ponz
Alardo de Popma
Vicente López Portaña
Miguel Posadas
Pedro Pozo
Blas de Prado
Francisco Preciado
Tomás Francisco Prieto
Andrea Procaccini
Dióscoro Puebla
Antonio de Puga
José Puyet

Q
Nicolás de la Quadra
José Comas Quesada
Cristóbal Hernández de Quintana
Isabel Quintanilla
Lorenzo Quiros

R
Pablo Rabiella
Eva Raboso
Albert Ràfols-Casamada
Carlos González Ragel
Andrea Ramirez
Benevides Juan Ramirez
Cristóbal Ramírez
Felipe Ramírez
Gerónimo Ramírez
Josef Ramírez
Juan Ramírez
Pedro Ramírez
Joan Ramos
Theo Ramos
Guillem Ramos-Poquí
Jorge Rando
Juan Bautista Ravanals
Isidoro de Redondillo
Darío de Regoyos
Antonio García Reinoso
Vicente Requena the Elder
Juan Rexach
Gabino Rey
Pablo Rey
Francisco de Reyna
Francesc Ribalta
Juan Ribalta
Hernán Picó Ribera
Juan Antonio Ribera
Juan Vicente Ribera
Jusepe de Ribera
Romà Ribera
Carlos Luis de Ribera y Fieve
David López Ribes
Antonio Richarte
Martín Rico
Ignacio de Ries
Lluís Rigalt
Antonio del Rincón
Alexandre de Riquer
Jose Risueño
Francisco Rizi
Juan Rizi
Juan de las Roelas
José Roma
Bartolomé Román
Pedro Romana
José Romeo
Covadonga Romero Rodríguez
Luis Ortiz Rosales
Joaquín Luque Roselló
Francisco Riba Rovira
Eduardo Rosales
Luis Royo
Romulo Royo
Dámaso Ruano
Joaquín Bernardo Rubert
José Ruiz y Blasco
Santiago Rusiñol

S
Jaime Sabartés
Paquita Sabrafen
Olga Sacharoff
Arthur Sachs
Manuel Sáez
Casimiro Sainz
Emilio Grau Sala
Emilio Sala (painter)
Cristóbal García Salmerón
Francisco Salmerón
Matilde Salvador i Segarra
Alfonso Grosso Sánchez
Mariano Ramón Sánchez
Pepi Sánchez
Bernat Sanjuan
Sanjulián
Antonio Saura
Josep Segrelles
Vicente Segrelles
Miquel Carbonell Selva
Eusebio Sempere
Jaime Serra
Pere Serra
Michel Serre
Josep Maria Sert
José María Sicilia
Francisco Pérez Sierra
Enrique Simonet
Francesca Stuart Sindici
Josep Costa Sobrepera
José Gutiérrez Solana
Josep Rovira Soler
Rigoberto Soler
Quinta del Sordo
Joaquín Sorolla
Fernando Álvarez de Sotomayor y Zaragoza
Aurelio Suárez
Alvar Suñol
Joaquim Sunyer

T
Antoni Tàpies
Antoni Taulé
Juan Caro de Tavira
Rafael Tegeo
Jorge Manuel Theotocópuli
José Belizón Tocino
Rafel Tona
Néstor Martín-Fernández de la Torre
Clemente de Torres
Josefa Texidor Torres
Julio Romero de Torres
Ramón Castellano de Torres
Xavier Navarro de Torres
Joaquín Torres-García
Ángeles Santos Torroella
Alonso Miguel de Tovar
Manuela Trasobares
Joaquin Mir Trinxet
Luis Tristán
Ramón Tusquets y Maignon
Joan Tuset Suau

U
Juan de Uceda
Pedro de Uceda
Marcelino de Unceta
Pablo Uranga
Eduardo Úrculo
Modest Urgell
José de Urrutia y de las Casas
Juan Uslé

V
Francisco Vera Cabeza de Vaca
Lucas de Valdés
Manolo Valdés
Domingo Valdivieso
Cristóbal Valero
Pedro Núñez del Valle
Dino Valls
Xavier Valls
Francisco Varela
Juan Varela
Andrés de Vargas
Luis de Vargas
Remedios Varo
Joaquim Vayreda
Marian Vayreda i Vila
Alonso Vázquez
Dolors Vázquez Aznar
José Gutiérrez de la Vega
Cristóbal Vela
Esteban Márquez de Velasco
Rosario de Velasco
Antonio González Velázquez
Diego Velázquez
Eugenio Lucas Velázquez
Luis González Velázquez
Zacarías González Velázquez
Francisco Venegas
Alejo Vera
Cristobal de Vera
Dionisio Baixeras Verdaguer
Esteban Vicente
Ignasi Vidal
Lluïsa Vidal
Antoni Vila Arrufat
Julio Vila y Prades
Antoni Viladomat
Xevi Vilaró
Eugenio Lucas Villaamil
Jenaro Pérez Villaamil
Nicolás de Villacis
Darío Villalba
Cristóbal de Villalpando
Rodrigo de Villandrando
Pedro Nuñez de Villavicencio
Juan de Villoldo
Javier de Villota
Salvador Viniegra
Miguel García Vivancos
Juan Correa de Vivar

W
Eduardo Westerdahl

X
Juan Ximenez
Miguel Ximénez
Rafael Ximeno y Planes

Y
Tomás Yepes

Z
Esperanza Zabala
Alonso de Llera Zambrano
Eduardo Zamacois y Zabala
José Vela Zanetti
José Antonio Zapata
Juan Zariñena
Rosario Weiss Zorrilla
Daniel Zuloaga
Ignacio Zuloaga
Manuel Osorio Manrique de Zúñiga
Francisco de Zurbarán
Juan de Zurbarán

Painters
Spanish